Two Run may refer to:
Two Run, Clay County, West Virginia
Two Run, Wirt County, West Virginia